Fissilabia is a genus of sea snails, marine gastropod mollusks in the family Planaxidae.

Species
Species within the genus Fissilabia include:
 Fissilabia decollata (Quoy & Gaimard, 1833)
 † Fissilabia houbricki Lozouet & Maestrati, 1995 
 † Fissilabia mirabilis (Grateloup, 1834) 
Species brought into synonymy
 Fissilabia fasciata MacGillivray, 1836: synonym of Fissilabia decollata (Quoy & Gaimard, 1833)

References

External links
 MacGillivray W. (1836). Description of a new shell. The Edinburgh Journal of Natural History and of the Physical Sciences. 1: 42.
 Gray, J. E.; Sowerby, G. B., I. (1839). Molluscous animals and their shells. Pp. 103-155, pls 33-34 [pp. 103-142 by J. E. Gray, 143-155 by G. B. Sowerby I. In: The zoology of Capt. Beechey's voyage, compiled from the collections on notes made by Captain Beechey, the officers and naturalist of the expedition during a voyage to the Pacific and Behring's straits in his Majesty's ship Blossom, under the command of Captain F. W. Beechey in the years 1825, 26, 27 and 28. London pp. XII + 186 + 44 pl.]
 Swainson, W. (1840). A treatise on malacology or shells and shell-fish. London, Longman. viii + 419 pp.

Planaxidae